Mike Hanrahan is a singer-songwriter and guitarist born in Ennis, County Clare, in September 1958.

Hanrahan spent fifteen years with Stockton's Wing as songwriter, guitarist and singer, and ten years with Ronnie Drew as guitarist, writer and producer.

Hanrahan spent 12 years on the board of IMRO Irish Music Rights Organisation, from 1994 to 2006. Three of those years he served as Deputy Chairman of IMRO, and six years as chairman.

Career
In 1977, Hanrahan worked with Maura O'Connell in a duo called Tumbleweed. In 1979, Hanrahan replaced Tony Callinan in Stockton's Wing and recorded Take a Chance. In 1980 Hanrahan recorded A Light in the Western Sky with Stockton's Wing, which featured six of Hanrahan's songs, including Beautiful Affair and Walkaway. In 1994, Hanrahan left Stockton's Wing after 15 years and several albums. He toured with Finbar Furey as guitarist and recorded two albums. He also released a  solo album, Someone Like You, for the Wundertutte label in Germany. In 1997 Ronnie Drew and Mike Hanrahan went on tour, called Ronnie I Hardly Knew Ya. Hanrahan produced The Humour Is on Me Now, and An Evening with Ronnie Drew and Mike Hanrahan. He also produced and performed on the Ronnie Drew and Eleanor Shanley Live album and the studio album El amore de mi vida. In 2011 Stockton's Wing, including Hanrahan, played several reunion concerts. In 2012, Hanrahan played live shows with Leslie Dowdall from In Tua Nua. In 2016, he wrote and produced a show to commemorate the music and songs of 1916 with Kerry legend  Brendan Begley. the Show Dublin Burning received critical acclaim.
Stocktons Wing returned in 2017 and 2018 to celebrate their 40th anniversary.

He is a trained cook and teacher from Ballymaloe Organic farm and Cookery school.

References

1958 births
Living people
Irish male singer-songwriters
Irish male guitarists
Stockton's Wing members